Fenimorea glennduffyi is a species of sea snail, a marine gastropod mollusc in the family Drilliidae.

Description
The length of this marine shell varies between 9 mm and 12 mm.

Distribution
This marine species occurs in the Caribbean Sea off the Dominican Republic.

References

External links
 Fallon P.J. (2016). Taxonomic review of tropical western Atlantic shallow water Drilliidae (Mollusca: Gastropoda: Conoidea) including descriptions of 100 new species. Zootaxa. 4090(1): 1–363
 

glennduffyi
Gastropods described in 2016